This is a list of municipalities (obce) of the Czech Republic which have status of a city, town or market town granted by law. As of 2022, there are 27 cities, 582 towns and 231 market towns in the Czech Republic.

The population is shown in brackets and is current to January 2022.

Cities

Prague (1,275,406)
Brno (379,466)
Ostrava (279,791)
Plzeň (168,733)
Liberec (102,951)
Olomouc (99,496)
České Budějovice (93,426)
Hradec Králové (90,596)
Ústí nad Labem (90,378)
Pardubice (88,520)
Zlín (72,973)
Havířov (69,084)
Kladno (66,903)
Most (62,866)
Opava (54,840)
Frýdek-Místek (53,899)
Jihlava (50,108)
Karviná (49,881)
Teplice (48,766)
Děčín (47,029)
Chomutov (46,263)
Karlovy Vary (45,500)
Jablonec nad Nisou (44,588)
Prostějov (43,055)
Mladá Boleslav (41,868)
Přerov (41,404)
Třinec (34,222)

Towns

Population 20,000 and more

Česká Lípa (36,740)
Třebíč (34,415)
Tábor (33,410)
Znojmo (33,370)
Kolín (32,046)
Příbram (31,651)
Cheb (30,420)
Písek (29,814)
Trutnov (29,430)
Orlová (28,206)
Kroměříž (27,838)
Vsetín (25,226)
Šumperk (24,910)
Uherské Hradiště (24,430)
Břeclav (23,943)
Hodonín (23,828)
Český Těšín (23,468)
Litoměřice (22,950)
Havlíčkův Brod (22,879)
Nový Jičín (22,813)
Chrudim (22,773)
Krnov (22,665)
Litvínov (22,482)
Strakonice (22,214)
Sokolov (22,097)
Valašské Meziříčí (21,883)
Klatovy (21,587)
Kopřivnice (21,395)
Jindřichův Hradec (20,774)
Kutná Hora (20,450)
Bohumín (20,450)
Žďár nad Sázavou (20,338)
Vyškov (20,187)

Population 10,000–19,999

Beroun (19,984)
Blansko (19,715)
Mělník (19,472)
Náchod (19,220)
Jirkov (18,945)
Brandýs nad Labem-Stará Boleslav (18,755)
Žatec (18,570)
Kralupy nad Vltavou (18,189)
Louny (17,760)
Kadaň (17,628)
Hranice (17,495)
Otrokovice (17,183)
Benešov (16,448)
Svitavy (16,261)
Uherský Brod (16,206)
Říčany (16,182)
Rožnov pod Radhoštěm (16,077)
Jičín (15,871)
Slaný (15,862)
Neratovice (15,831)
Ostrov (15,822)
Pelhřimov (15,755)
Bruntál (15,523)
Dvůr Králové nad Labem (15,170)
Rakovník (15,142)
Česká Třebová (15,062)
Nymburk (14,780)
Varnsdorf (14,738)
Bílina (14,420)
Poděbrady (14,317)
Klášterec nad Ohří (14,190)
Turnov (14,174)
Ústí nad Orlicí (13,936)
Rokycany (13,826)
Hlučín (13,562)
Zábřeh (13,281)
Šternberk (13,144)
Chodov (12,683)
Tachov (12,538)
Roudnice nad Labem (12,506)
Aš (12,483)
Český Krumlov (12,461)
Milovice (12,460)
Krupka (12,365)
Jaroměř (12,260)
Mariánské Lázně (12,237)
Čelákovice (12,008)
Vysoké Mýto (12,007)
Vrchlabí (11,968)
Boskovice (11,661)
Nový Bor (11,458)
Holešov (11,426)
Vlašim (11,357)
Velké Meziříčí (11,325)
Uničov (11,066)
Kyjov (10,849)
Kuřim (10,847)
Domažlice (10,749)
Humpolec (10,741)
Rychnov nad Kněžnou (10,717)
Rumburk (10,679)
Sušice (10,662)
Jeseník (10,658)
Prachatice (10,588)
Veselí nad Moravou (10,577)
Frenštát pod Radhoštěm (10,569)
Čáslav (10,128)

Population 5,000–9,999

Králův Dvůr (9,995)
Litomyšl (9,914)
Nové Město na Moravě (9,829)
Frýdlant nad Ostravicí (9,796)
Jesenice (9,777)
Ivančice (9,737)
Lysá nad Labem (9,732)
Moravská Třebová (9,656)
Litovel (9,567)
Hlinsko (9,416)
Lanškroun (9,326)
Přelouč (9,315)
Studénka (9,277)
Tišnov (9,164)
Nové Město nad Metují (9,132)
Mohelnice (9,103)
Chotěboř (8,995)
Nová Paka (8,857)
Hostivice (8,777)
Mnichovo Hradiště (8,711)
Polička (8,710)
Dobříš (8,707)
Roztoky (8,611)
Lovosice (8,605)
Duchcov (8,589)
Choceň (8,477)
Štětí (8,438)
Příbor (8,297)
Hořice (8,274)
Červený Kostelec (8,229)
Semily (8,120)
Třeboň (8,092)
Milevsko (8,033)
Bystřice pod Hostýnem (7,984)
Rýmařov (7,969)
Bystřice nad Pernštejnem (7,835)
Lipník nad Bečvou (7,826)
Dubí (7,805)
Týn nad Vltavou (7,804)
Hrádek nad Nisou (7,704)
Šlapanice (7,640)
Rychvald (7,614)
Nejdek (7,608)
Stříbro (7,430)
Mikulov (7,427)
Benátky nad Jizerou (7,410)
Petřvald (7,396)
Frýdlant (7,380)
Bílovec (7,341)
Černošice (7,329)
Vratimov (7,276)
Odry (7,274)
Vimperk (7,255)
Moravské Budějovice (7,167)
Broumov (7,145)
Dačice (7,142)
Napajedla (7,074)
Český Brod (7,071)
Úvaly (7,035)
Sezimovo Ústí (7,018)
Slavkov u Brna (6,992)
Kaplice (6,984)
Nový Bydžov (6,982)
Nýřany (6,891)
Hořovice (6,882)
Vodňany (6,848)
Soběslav (6,830)
Sedlčany (6,799)
Letovice (6,669)
Přeštice (6,645)
Kravaře (6,601)
Staré Město (6,552)
Holice (6,542)
Kraslice (6,537)
Hulín (6,533)
Dobruška (6,518)
Bučovice (6,510)
Šenov (6,477)
Rosice (6,466)
Letohrad (6,377)
Blatná (6,371)
Mimoň (6,361)
Světlá nad Sázavou (6,335)
Veselí nad Lužnicí (6,317)
Chrastava (6,260)
Podbořany (6,248)
Dubňany (6,231)
Slavičín (6,227)
Odolena Voda (6,163)
Dobřany (6,128)
Kostelec nad Orlicí (6,090)
Mníšek pod Brdy (6,060)
Hronov (6,032)
Týniště nad Orlicí (6,001)
Hustopeče (5,998)
Tanvald (5,958)
Žamberk (5,918)
Železný Brod (5,883)
Kojetín (5,837)
Šluknov (5,721)
Třebechovice pod Orebem (5,706)
Týnec nad Sázavou (5,667)
Rousínov (5,648)
Třešť (5,625)
Moravský Krumlov (5,606)
Vítkov (5,593)
Nové Strašecí (5,573)
Chlumec nad Cidlinou (5,561)
Lomnice nad Popelkou (5,486)
Fulnek (5,484)
Úpice (5,468)
Brumov-Bylnice (5,457)
Kunovice (5,452)
Zubří (5,450)
Hradec nad Moravicí (5,434)
Strážnice (5,390)
Hluboká nad Vltavou (5,353)
Jilemnice (5,352)
Stochov (5,348)
Pohořelice (5,312)
Jablunkov (5,284)
Planá (5,278)
Modřice (5,263)
Horní Slavkov (5,208)
Starý Plzenec (5,204)
Trhové Sviny (5,187)
Františkovy Lázně (5,187)
Velká Bíteš (5,167)
Polná (5,147)
Telč (5,140)
Horažďovice (5,113)
Rudná (5,090)
Kdyně (5,088)
Doksy (5,081)
Holýšov (5,075)
Jílové (5,062)
Třemošná (5,053)
Česká Kamenice (5,028)
Skuteč (5,022)

Population 2,500–4,999

Bakov nad Jizerou (4,967)
Luhačovice (4,955)
Česká Skalice (4,945)
Jílové u Prahy (4,919)
Bechyně (4,876)
Horšovský Týn (4,839)
Valašské Klobouky (4,839)
Vrbno pod Pradědem (4,839)
Unhošť (4,827)
Vizovice (4,809)
Ledeč nad Sázavou (4,808)
Nýrsko (4,806)
Pečky (4,771)
Kosmonosy (4,755)
Chropyně (4,749)
Oslavany (4,746)
Náměšť nad Oslavou (4,723)
Heřmanův Městec (4,721)
Bělá pod Bezdězem (4,714)
Zruč nad Sázavou (4,709)
Protivín (4,687)
Habartov (4,687)
Meziboří (4,686)
Postoloprty (4,644)
Pacov (4,604)
Osek (4,596)
Kynšperk nad Ohří (4,590)
Vamberk (4,530)
Vracov (4,513)
Lišov (4,508)
Votice (4,495)
Cvikov (4,479)
Klimkovice (4,469)
Bystřice (4,456)
Adamov (4,429)
Bor (4,403)
Bojkovice (4,310)
Bzenec (4,303)
Planá nad Lužnicí (4,296)
Hostinné (4,265)
Hluk (4,249)
Chlumec (4,237)
Rožmitál pod Třemšínem (4,203)
Uherský Ostroh (4,178)
Kostelec nad Labem (4,156)
Brušperk (4,149)
Borovany (4,137)
Nová Role (4,125)
Blovice (4,114)
Slatiňany (4,102)
Horní Bříza (4,091)
Sezemice (4,062)
Zdice (4,047)
Jaroměřice nad Rokytnou (4,032)
Králíky (4,002)
Mnichovice (3,964)
Police nad Metují (3,961)
Jemnice (3,958)
Přibyslav (3,957)
Rajhrad (3,956)
Dolní Benešov (3,939)
Kamenický Šenov (3,923)
Paskov (3,830)
Velké Bílovice (3,818)
Velešín (3,796)
Kostelec nad Černými lesy (3,773)
Brtnice (3,761)
Větřní (3,758)
Stráž pod Ralskem (3,756)
Smržovka (3,754)
Fryšták (3,729)
Volary (3,712)
Buštěhrad (3,703)
Sázava (3,702)
Jablonné v Podještědí (3,685)
Zbýšov (3,684)
Židlochovice (3,679)
Rájec-Jestřebí (3,672)
Nové Město pod Smrkem (3,663)
Lom (3,655)
Dobřichovice (3,651)
Kamenice nad Lipou (3,634)
Lázně Bělohrad (3,625)
Zlaté Hory (3,620)
Lanžhot (3,608)
Klecany (3,601)
Řevnice (3,584)
Toužim (3,582)
Benešov nad Ploučnicí (3,573)
Nepomuk (3,550)
Velké Opatovice (3,536)
Stod (3,531)
Suchdol nad Lužnicí (3,527)
Velká Bystřice (3,516)
Štěpánov (3,512)
Březnice (3,511)
Dobrovice (3,496)
Zliv (3,495)
Jiříkov (3,490)
Valtice (3,488)
Veverská Bítýška (3,478)
Štramberk (3,467)
Libčice nad Vltavou (3,456)
České Velenice (3,439)
Lázně Bohdaneč (3,438)
Město Albrechtice (3,421)
Libochovice (3,411)
Kralovice (3,410)
Krásná Lípa (3,405)
Újezd u Brna (3,335)
Staňkov (3,307)
Libušín (3,281)
Trmice (3,251)
Hrušovany nad Jevišovkou (3,245)
Nová Bystřice (3,192)
Košťany (3,190)
Sadská (3,189)
Chrast (3,138)
Ždírec nad Doubravou (3,083)
Uhlířské Janovice (3,077)
Žacléř (3,058)
Desná (3,057)
Opočno (3,053)
Velké Pavlovice (3,052)
Loket (3,034)
Třemošnice (3,021)
Kaznějov (3,016)
Miroslav (3,003)
Břidličná (2,979)
Smiřice (2,969)
Hanušovice (2,962)
Velvary (2,958)
Podivín (2,954)
Volyně (2,952)
Loštice (2,947)
Hodkovice nad Mohelkou (2,932)
Morkovice-Slížany (2,922)
Chvaletice (2,910)
Teplá (2,909)
Rtyně v Podkrkonoší (2,904)
Jablonné nad Orlicí (2,904)
Ivanovice na Hané (2,893)
Slušovice (2,892)
Budišov nad Budišovkou (2,869)
Spálené Poříčí (2,868)
Žirovnice (2,868)
Kostelec na Hané (2,861)
Sedlec-Prčice (2,860)
Moravský Beroun (2,860)
Zákupy (2,855)
Úštěk (2,854)
Plasy (2,827)
Raspenava (2,825)
Dolní Bousov (2,814)
Terezín (2,812)
Rotava (2,809)
Jevíčko (2,792)
Kunštát (2,788)
Městec Králové (2,784)
Rychnov u Jablonce nad Nisou (2,756)
Český Dub (2,754)
Hrádek (2,728)
Vejprty (2,704)
Neveklov (2,691)
Golčův Jeníkov (2,689)
Konice (2,681)
Hejnice (2,680)
Mladá Vožice (2,670)
Koryčany (2,661)
Kelč (2,655)
Velké Hamry (2,637)
Březová (2,616)
Javorník (2,607)
Luže (2,590)
Nové Sedlo (2,554)
Vyšší Brod (2,549)
Rokytnice nad Jizerou (2,537)
Rudolfov (2,530)
Netolice (2,527)
Chabařovice (2,523)

Population less than 2,500

Nové Hrady (2,499)
Ždánice (2,494)
Počátky (2,465)
Dolní Kounice (2,461)
Chýnov (2,459)
Bohušovice nad Ohří (2,454)
Zbiroh (2,450)
Klobouky u Brna (2,426)
Karolinka (2,426)
Tovačov (2,411)
Kryry (2,352)
Nechanice (2,349)
Meziměstí (2,334)
Sobotka (2,318)
Jáchymov (2,315)
Janovice nad Úhlavou (2,307)
Slavonice (2,282)
Veltrusy (2,263)
Dašice (2,261)
Plumlov (2,258)
Horní Benešov (2,246)
Kardašova Řečice (2,237)
Mirošov (2,234)
Nová Včelnice (2,214)
Žlutice (2,195)
Horní Jiřetín (2,195)
Město Touškov (2,186)
Solnice (2,186)
Budyně nad Ohří (2,143)
Žebrák (2,139)
Kopidlno (2,136)
Týnec nad Labem (2,127)
Ralsko (2,114)
Pyšely (2,108)
Borohrádek (2,091)
Luby (2,086)
Jistebnice (2,077)
Mikulášovice (2,076)
Horní Jelení (2,070)
Nový Knín (2,069)
Proseč (2,068)
Hranice (2,057)
Zásmuky (2,054)
Hroznětín (2,053)
Hrochův Týnec (2,051)
Hrob (2,015)
Horní Planá (1,993)
Velký Šenov (1,979)
Rokytnice v Orlických horách (1,971)
Štíty (1,967)
Svoboda nad Úpou (1,937)
Kouřim (1,919)
Žandov (1,917)
Smečno (1,914)
Lučany nad Nisou (1,911)
Bochov (1,908)
Skalná (1,905)
Plesná (1,904)
Libáň (1,900)
Němčice nad Hanou (1,898)
Třebenice (1,892)
Vroutek (1,833)
Horní Cerekev (1,786)
Hostomice (1,783)
Lomnice nad Lužnicí (1,780)
Radnice (1,775)
Hoštka (1,751)
Černovice (1,750)
Ronov nad Doubravou (1,746)
Seč (1,738)
Hrotovice (1,737)
Bělá nad Radbuzou (1,731)
Staré Město (1,709)
Vlachovo Březí (1,703)
Dubá (1,678)
Nasavrky (1,674)
Dolní Poustevna (1,650)
Všeruby (1,648)
Švihov (1,644)
Olešnice (1,640)
Březová nad Svitavou (1,636)
Jesenice (1,635)
Plánice (1,631)
Bavorov (1,621)
Rožďalovice (1,619)
Kladruby (1,610)
Oloví (1,597)
Mirovice (1,595)
Teplice nad Metují (1,580)
Jablonec nad Jizerou (1,576)
Železná Ruda (1,573)
Poběžovice (1,512)
Mýto (1,511)
Přimda (1,486)
Kožlany (1,484)
Bystré (1,480)
Strmilov (1,445)
Mšeno (1,416)
Husinec (1,412)
Lázně Kynžvart (1,410)
Trhový Štěpánov (1,390)
Kašperské Hory (1,375)
Svratka (1,362)
Strážov (1,357)
Chřibská (1,323)
Železnice (1,315)
Habry (1,313)
Rovensko pod Troskami (1,309)
Harrachov (1,301)
Kasejovice (1,300)
Brandýs nad Orlicí (1,295)
Vysoké nad Jizerou (1,291)
Sedlice (1,261)
Hostouň (1,226)
Mirotice (1,222)
Pilníkov (1,209)
Vidnava (1,198)
Osečná (1,179)
Potštát (1,170)
Verneřice (1,162)
Nalžovské Hory (1,161)
Žulová (1,155)
Jevišovice (1,146)
Úsov (1,139)
Černošín (1,133)
Manětín (1,128)
Měčín (1,114)
Krásná Hora nad Vltavou (1,091)
Liběchov (1,084)
Červená Řečice (1,009)
Blšany (991)
Špindlerův Mlýn (979)
Bělčice (974)
Bezdružice (940)
Miletín (933)
Hartmanice (929)
Bečov nad Teplou (918)
Stráž nad Nežárkou (870)
Abertamy (866)
Vysoké Veselí (853)
Miličín (843)
Deštná (739)
Krásno (689)
Janské Lázně (655)
Stárkov (645)
Lipnice nad Sázavou (641)
Pec pod Sněžkou (599)
Chyše (588)
Mašťov (556)
Ledvice (531)
Rabí (480)
Úterý (466)
Hora Svaté Kateřiny (439)
Andělská Hora (395)
Krásné Údolí (389)
Rožmberk nad Vltavou (373)
Horní Blatná (361)
Výsluní (276)
Janov (271)
Rejštejn (239)
Boží Dar (227)
Loučná pod Klínovcem (135)
Přebuz (77)

Market towns

Population 1,000 and more

Nehvizdy (3,833)
Luka nad Jihlavou (3,039)
Křemže (2,918)
Jedovnice (2,805)
Suchdol nad Odrou (2,668)
Moravská Nová Ves (2,564)
Nový Hrozenkov (2,509)
Ledenice (2,467)
Komárov (2,418)
Buchlovice (2,387)
Batelov (2,350)
Velké Poříčí (2,338)
Všetaty (2,327)
Peruc (2,308)
Jince (2,297)
Pozořice (2,286)
Mladé Buky (2,274)
Zlonice (2,255)
Náměšť na Hané (2,161)
Černá Hora (2,139)
Štěchovice (2,116)
Lhenice (2,097)
Škvorec (2,036)
Drásov (2,029)
Okříšky (2,010)
Polešovice (2,009)
Měřín (1,983)
Kamenice (1,967)
Štoky (1,950)
Červené Pečky (1,947)
Plaňany (1,911)
Chlum u Třeboně (1,885)
Lysice (1,877)
Brodek u Přerova (1,876)
Křižanov (1,846)
Chodová Planá (1,841)
Drnholec (1,834)
Malšice (1,827)
Cerhenice (1,808)
Svitávka (1,803)
Davle (1,765)
Velké Němčice (1,759)
Doudleby nad Orlicí (1,747)
Divišov (1,739)
Hustopeče nad Bečvou (1,729)
Častolovice (1,707)
Kralice na Hané (1,681)
Stařeč (1,679)
Dolní Bukovsko (1,674)
Svatava (1,617)
Dub nad Moravou (1,604)
Kounice (1,598)
Krucemburk (1,583)
Brodek u Prostějova (1,488)
Nezamyslice (1,485)
Dřevohostice (1,479)
Želetava (1,476)
Lomnice (1,460)
Lázně Toušeň (1,439)
Kolinec (1,437)
Čechtice (1,412)
Březová (1,386)
Chotětov (1,380)
Sepekov (1,378)
Ševětín (1,373)
Doubravice nad Svitavou (1,372)
Loučeň (1,369)
Dolní Čermná (1,356)
Nové Veselí (1,352)
Mohelno (1,349)
Nosislav (1,349)
Velký Újezd (1,348)
Katovice (1,330)
Klenčí pod Čerchovem (1,326)
Bernartice (1,323)
Radomyšl (1,317)
Křinec (1,311)
Frymburk (1,304)
Pecka (1,292)
Nedvědice (1,289)
Brozany nad Ohří (1,287)
Senomaty (1,265)
Dolní Cerekev (1,265)
Strunkovice nad Blanicí (1,264)
Pozlovice (1,250)
Stráž (1,240)
Chroustovice (1,232)
Liteň (1,207)
Choltice (1,198)
Blížkovice (1,198)
Hostomice (1,189)
Budišov (1,186)
Bohdalov (1,169)
Vladislav (1,167)
Netvořice (1,163)
Cerhovice (1,163)
Radiměř (1,151)
Jimramov (1,141)
Nová Cerekev (1,138)
Olbramovice (1,120)
Suchdol (1,110)
Ostrov u Macochy (1,104)
Šatov (1,101)
Stonařov (1,096)
Brodce (1,089)
Deblín (1,087)
Česká Bělá (1,083)
Načeradec (1,073)
Višňové (1,067)
Machov (1,058)
Cítoliby (1,057)
Březno (1,045)
Pavlíkov (1,045)
Protivanov (1,030)
Švábenice (1,026)
Kněževes (1,012)
Malešov (1,010)
Vrchotovy Janovice (1,006)
Koloveč (1,003)

Population less than 1,000

Nový Rychnov (996)
Měcholupy (982)
Kovářská (978)
Havlíčkova Borová (976)
Lukavec (969)
Bezno (967)
Ostrov nad Oslavou (965)
Vilémov (964)
Trhová Kamenice (956)
Libštát (952)
Sloup (946)
Knínice (937)
Litultovice (934)
Radostín nad Oslavou (926)
Kunvald (917)
Čestice (916)
Nové Dvory (914)
Boleradice (903)
Bobrová (901)
Mšec (897)
Spálov (895)
Osvětimany (892)
Zásada (890)
Brankovice (884)
Hořice na Šumavě (880)
Zápy (876)
Mrákotín (875)
Prosiměřice (866)
Medlov (860)
Libice nad Doubravou (857)
Nový Hrádek (853)
Žinkovy (846)
Karlštejn (844)
Rokytnice nad Rokytnou (838)
Strážek (838)
Nová Říše (830)
Žehušice (827)
Štěkeň (822)
Křtiny (818)
Doubravník (815)
Vysoký Chlumec (807)
Besednice (805)
Ostrovačice (790)
Všeruby (779)
Opatov (773)
Vojnův Městec (771)
Kácov (770)
Vraný (758)
Chudenice (752)
Vranov nad Dyjí (750)
Maršovice (749)
Sněžné (729)
Slabce (709)
Štěpánov nad Svratkou (705)
Vémyslice (705)
Borotín (696)
Troskotovice (696)
Dešenice (694)
Úsobí (694)
Křivoklát (693)
Černý Důl (683)
Přídolí (675)
Oleksovice (661)
Louňovice pod Blaníkem (658)
Bojanov (644)
Mikulovice (637)
Větrný Jeníkov (627)
Božejov (623)
Stará Říše (622)
Slavětín (614)
České Heřmanice (607)
Štítary (599)
Bílé Podolí (596)
Stádlec (587)
Choustníkovo Hradiště (577)
Hvězdlice (563)
Dalešice (560)
Včelákov (554)
Ročov (553)
Mlázovice (548)
Neustupov (543)
Rataje nad Sázavou (538)
Holany (536)
Mladkov (532)
Olbramkostel (521)
Zdislavice (518)
Drahany (508)
Uhelná Příbram (500)
Čachrov (498)
Litenčice (478)
Podhradí (471)
Tištín (458)
Staré Město pod Landštejnem (456)
Křivsoudov (439)
Panenský Týnec (439)
Nepomyšl (421)
Strážný (391)
Dub (385)
Běhařovice (377)
Heraltice (362)
Svojanov (359)
Sovínky (323)
Žernov (283)
Vratěnín (280)
Žumberk (272)
Zdislava (270)
Liblín (258)
Lukov (257)
Velký Vřešťov (240)
Zvíkovec (215)
Český Šternberk (163)
Levín (143)

Most populated municipalities without the town status

Bystřice (5,261)
Dolní Lutyně (5,244)
Ludgeřovice (4,938)
Petrovice u Karviné (4,853)
Kamenice (4,782)
Těrlicko (4,731)
Horoměřice (4,511)
Vendryně (4,479)
Bolatice (4,439)
Horní Suchá (4,433)
Vejprnice (4,424)
Dolní Břežany (4,380)
Dětmarovice (4,344)
Chýně (4,309)
Hlubočky (4,175)
Psáry (4,115)

References

 
Czech Republic
Czech Republic
Lists of municipalities of the Czech Republic